A welfare state is a form of government in which the state (or a well-established network of social institutions) protects and promotes the economic and social well-being of its citizens, based upon the principles of equal opportunity, equitable distribution of wealth, and public responsibility for citizens unable to avail themselves of the minimal provisions for a good life.

There is substantial variability in the form and trajectory of the welfare state across countries and regions. All welfare states entail some degree of private-public partnerships wherein the administration and delivery of at least some welfare programmes occurs through private entities. Welfare state services are also provided at varying territorial levels of government.

Early features of the welfare state, such as public pensions and social insurance, developed from the 1880s onwards in industrializing Western countries. World War I, the Great Depression, and World War II have been characterized as important events that ushered in expansions of the welfare state. The fullest forms of the welfare state were developed after World War II.

Etymology 
The German term sozialstaat ("social state") has been used since 1870 to describe state support programs devised by German sozialpolitiker ("social politicians") and implemented as part of Otto von Bismarck's conservative reforms.

The literal English equivalent "social state" did not catch on in Anglophone countries. However, during the Second World War, Anglican Archbishop William Temple, author of the book Christianity and the Social Order (1942), popularized the concept using the phrase "welfare state". Bishop Temple's use of "welfare state" has been connected to Benjamin Disraeli's 1845 novel Sybil: or the Two Nations (in other words, the rich and the poor), where he writes "power has only one duty – to secure the social welfare of the PEOPLE". At the time he wrote Sybil, Disraeli (later a prime minister) belonged to Young England, a conservative group of youthful Tories who disagreed with how the Whigs dealt with the conditions of the industrial poor. Members of Young England attempted to garner support among the privileged classes to assist the less fortunate and to recognize the dignity of labor that they imagined had characterized England during the Feudal Middle Ages.

History

Ancient

India 
Emperor Ashoka of India put forward his idea of a welfare state in the 3rd century BCE. He envisioned his dharma (religion or path) as not just a collection of high-sounding phrases.  He consciously tried to adopt it as a matter of state policy; he declared that "all men are my children" and "whatever exertion I make, I strive only to discharge debt that I owe to all living creatures." It was a totally new ideal of kingship. Ashoka renounced war and conquest by violence and forbade the killing of many animals. Since he wanted to conquer the world through love and faith, he sent many missions to propagate Dharma. Such missions were sent to places like Egypt, Greece, and Sri Lanka. The propagation of Dharma included many measures of people's welfare. Centers of the treatment of men and beasts founded inside and outside of the empire. Shady groves, wells, orchards and rest houses were laid out.  Ashoka also prohibited useless sacrifices and certain forms of gatherings which led to waste, indiscipline and superstition. To implement these policies he recruited a new cadre of officers called Dharmamahamattas. Part of this group's duties was to see that people of various sects were treated fairly. They were especially asked to look after the welfare of prisoners.

However, the historical record of Ashoka's character is conflicted. Ashoka's own inscriptions state that he converted to Buddhism after waging a destructive war. However, the Sri Lankan tradition claims that he had already converted to Buddhism in the 4th year of his reign, prior to the conquest of Kalinga. During this war, according to Ashoka's Major Rock Edict 13, his forces killed 100,000 men and animals and enslaved another 150,000. Some sources (particularly Buddhist oral legends) suggest that his conversion was dramatic and that he dedicated the rest of his life to the pursuit of peace and the common good. However, these sources frequently contradict each other, and sources soundly dated nearer to the Edicts (like Ashokavadana, circa 200 BCE at the earliest) describe Ashoka engaging in sectarian mass murder throughout his reign, and make no mention of the philanthropic efforts claimed by later legends. The interpretation of Ashoka's dharma after conversion is controversial, but in particular, the texts which describe him personally ordering the massacre of Buddhist heretics and Jains have been disputed by some fringe Buddhist scholars. They allege that these claims are propaganda, albeit without historical, archaeological, or linguistic evidence. It is unclear if they believe the entire Ashokavadana to be an ancient fabrication, or just the sections related to Ashoka's post-conversion violence.

China 
The Emperor Wen (203 – 157 BCE) of Han Dynasty instituted a variety of measures with resemblances to modern welfare policies. These included pensions, in the form of food and wine, to all over 80 years of age, as well as monetary support, in the form of loans or tax breaks, to widows, orphans, and elderly without children to support them. Emperor Wen was also known for a concern over wasteful spending of tax-payer money. Unlike other Han emperors, he wore simple silk garments. In order to make the state serve the common people better, cruel criminal punishments were lessened and the state bureaucracy was made more meritocratic. This led to officials being selected by examinations for the first time in Chinese history.

Rome 
The Roman Republic intervened sporadically to distribute free or subsidized grain to its population, through the program known as Cura Annonae. The city of Rome grew rapidly during the Roman Republic and Empire, reaching a population approaching one million in the second century AD. The population of the city grew beyond the capacity of the nearby rural areas to meet the food needs of the city.

Regular grain distribution began in 123 BC with a grain law proposed by Gaius Gracchus and approved by the Roman Plebeian Council (popular assembly). The numbers of those receiving free or subsidized grain expanded to a high of an estimated 320,000 people at one point. In the 3rd century AD, the dole of grain was replaced by bread, probably during the reign of Septimius Severus (193–211 AD).  Severus also began providing olive oil to residents of Rome, and later the emperor Aurelian (270–275) ordered the distribution of wine and pork. The doles of bread, olive oil, wine, and pork apparently continued until near the end of the Western Roman Empire in 476 AD. The dole in the early Roman Empire is estimated to account for 15 to 33 percent of the total grain imported and consumed in Rome.

In addition to food, the Roman Republic also supplied free entertainment, through ludi (public games).  Public money was allocated for the staging of ludi, but the presiding official increasingly came to augment the splendor of his games from personal funds as a form of public relations. The sponsor was able to cultivate the favor of the people of Rome.

Middle East

Arabia
The concept of states taxing for the welfare budget was introduced to the Arabs in the early 7th century by caliph Omar, most likely adapted from the newly Roman territories (. Zakat is also one of the five pillars of Islam and is a mandatory form of 2.5% income tax to be paid by all individuals earning above a basic threshold to provide for the needy once a year after Ramadan. Umar (584–644), leader of the Rashidun Caliphate (empire), established a welfare state  through the Bayt al-mal (treasury), which for instance was used to stockpile food in every region of the Islamic Empire reserved for Arabs in the Peninsula.

Modern 
Otto von Bismarck established the first welfare state in a modern industrial society, with social-welfare legislation, in 1880s Imperial Germany. Bismarck extended the privileges of the Junker social class to ordinary Germans. His 17 November 1881 Imperial Message to the Reichstag used the term "practical Christianity" to describe his program. German laws from this era also insured workers against industrial risks inherent in the workplace.

In Switzerland, the Swiss Factory Act of 1877 limited working hours for everyone, and gave maternity benefits.  The Swiss welfare state also arose in the late 19th century; its existence and depth varied individually by canton. Some of the programs first adopted were emergency relief, elementary schools, and homes for the elderly and children.

In the Austro-Hungarian Empire, a version was set up by Count Eduard von Taaffe a few years after Bismarck in Germany. Legislation to help the working class in Austria emerged from Catholic conservatives. Von Taffe used Swiss and German models of social reform, including the Swiss Factory Act of 1877 German laws that insured workers against industrial risks inherent in the workplace to create the 1885 Trade Code Amendment.

Changed attitudes in reaction to the worldwide Great Depression of the 1930s, which brought unemployment and misery to millions, were instrumental in the move to the welfare state in many countries. During the Great Depression, the welfare state was seen as a "middle way" between the extremes of communism on the left and unregulated laissez-faire capitalism on the right. In the period following World War II, some countries in Western Europe moved from partial or selective provision of social services to relatively comprehensive "cradle-to-grave" coverage of the population. Other Western European states did not, such as the United Kingdom, Ireland, Spain and France. Political scientist Eileen McDonagh has argued that a major determinant of where welfare states arose is whether or not a country had a historical monarchy with familial foundations (a trait that Max Weber called patrimonialism); in places where the monarchic state was viewed as a parental steward of the populace, it was easier to shift into a mindset where the industrial state could also serve as a parental steward of the populace.

The activities of present-day welfare states extend to the provision of both cash welfare benefits (such as old-age pensions or unemployment benefits) and in-kind welfare services (such as health or childcare services). Through these provisions, welfare states can affect the distribution of wellbeing and personal autonomy among their citizens, as well as influencing how their citizens consume and how they spend their time.

Analysis 
Historian of the 20th Century fascist movement, Robert Paxton, observes that the provisions of the welfare state were enacted in the 19th century by religious conservatives to counteract appeals from trade unions and socialism. Later, Paxton writes "All the modern twentieth-century European dictatorships of the right, both fascist and authoritarian, were welfare states…  They all provided medical care, pensions, affordable housing, and mass transport as a matter of course, in order to maintain productivity, national unity, and social peace." In Germany, Adolf Hitler's Nazi Party maintained the welfare state established by previous German governments, but restructured it so as to help only Aryan individuals considered worthy of assistance, excluding "alcoholics, tramps, homosexuals, prostitutes, the 'work-shy' or the 'asocial', habitual criminals, the hereditarily ill (a widely defined category) and members of races other than the Aryan." Nevertheless, even with these limitations, over 17 million German citizens were receiving assistance under the auspices of the National Socialist People's Welfare by 1939.

When social democratic parties abandoned Marxism after World War II, they increasingly accepted the welfare state as a political goal, either as a temporary goal within capitalism or an ultimate goal in itself.

A theoretical addition from 2005 is that of Kahl in their article 'The religious roots of modern policy: Catholic, Lutheran and Reformed Protestant traditions compared'. They argue that the welfare state policies of several European countries can be traced back to their religious origins. This process has its origin in the 'poor relief' systems, and social norms present in Christian nations. The example countries are categorized as follows: Catholic – Spain, Italy and France; Lutheran – Denmark, Sweden and Germany; Reformed Protestant – Netherlands, the UK and the USA. The Catholic countries late adoption of welfare benefits and social assistance, the latter being splintered and meagre, is due to several religious and social factors. Alms giving was an important part of catholic society as the wealthy could resolve their sins through participation in the act. As such, begging was allowed and was subject to a greater degree of acceptance. Poverty was seen as being close to grace and there was no onus for change placed onto the poor. These factors coupled with the power of the church meant that state provided benefits did not arise until late in the 20th century. Additionally, social assistance was not done at a comprehensive level, each group in need had their assistance added incrementally. This accounts for the fragmented nature of social assistance in these countries.

Lutheran states were early to provide welfare and late to provide social assistance but this was done uniformly. Poverty was seen as more of an individual affliction of laziness and immorality. Work was viewed as a calling. As such these societies banned begging and created workhouses to force the able-bodied to work. These uniform state actions paved the way for comprehensive welfare benefits, as those who worked deserved assistance when in need. When social assistance was delivered for those who had never worked, it was in the context of the uniform welfare provision. The concept of Predestination is key for understanding welfare assistance in Reformed Protestant states. Poor people were seen as being punished, therefore begging and state assistance was non existent. As such churches and charities filled the void resulting in early social assistance and late welfare benefits. The USA still has minimal welfare benefits today, because of their religious roots, according to Kahl.

Also from 2005, Jacob Hacker stated that there was "broad agreement" in research on welfare that there had not been welfare state retrenchment. Instead, "social policy frameworks remain secure."

Forms 

Broadly speaking, welfare states are either universal, with provisions that cover everybody; or selective, with provisions covering only those deemed most needy. In his 1990 book, The Three Worlds of Welfare Capitalism, Danish sociologist Gøsta Esping-Andersen further identified three subtypes of welfare state models.

Since the building of the decommodification index is limited and the typology is debatable, these 18 countries could be ranked from most purely social-democratic (Sweden) to the most liberal (the United States). Ireland represents a near-hybrid model whereby two streams of unemployment benefit exist: contributory and means-tested. However, payments can begin immediately and are theoretically available to all Irish citizens even if they have never worked, provided they are habitually resident.

Social stigma varies across the three conceptual welfare states. Particularly, it is highest in liberal states, and lowest in social democratic states. Esping-Andersen proposes that the universalist nature of social democratic states eliminate the duality between beneficiaries and non-recipients, whereas in means-tested liberal states there is resentment towards redistribution efforts. That is to say, the lower the percent of GDP spent on welfare, the higher the stigma of the welfare state. Esping-Andersen also argues that welfare states set the stage for post-industrial employment evolution in terms of employment growth, structure, and stratification. He uses Germany, Sweden, and the United States to provide examples of the differing results of each of the three welfare states.

According to Evelyne Huber and John Stephens, different types of welfare states emerged as a result of prolonged government by different parties. They distinguish between social democratic welfare states, Christian democratic welfare states, and "wage earner" states.

According to the Swedish political scientist Bo Rothstein, in non-universal welfare states, the state is primarily concerned with directing resources to "the people most in need". This requires tight bureaucratic control in order to determine who is eligible for assistance and who is not. Under universal models such as Sweden, on the other hand, the state distributes welfare to all people who fulfill easily established criteria (e.g. having children, receiving medical treatment, etc.) with as little bureaucratic interference as possible. This, however, requires higher taxation due to the scale of services provided. This model was constructed by the Scandinavian ministers Karl Kristian Steincke and Gustav Möller in the 1930s and is dominant in Scandinavia.

Sociologist Lane Kenworthy argues that the Nordic experience demonstrates that the modern social democratic model can "promote economic security, expand opportunity, and ensure rising living standards for all ... while facilitating freedom, flexibility and market dynamism."

American political scientist Benjamin Radcliff has also argued that the universality and generosity of the welfare state (i.e. the extent of decommodification) is the single most important societal-level structural factor affecting the quality of human life, based on the analysis of time serial data across both the industrial democracies and the American States. He maintains that the welfare state improves life for everyone, regardless of social class (as do similar institutions, such as pro-worker labor market regulations and strong labor unions).

By country or region

Australia 

Prior to 1900 in Australia, charitable assistance from benevolent societies, sometimes with financial contributions from the authorities, was the primary means of relief for people not able to support themselves. The 1890s economic depression and the rise of the trade unions and the Labor parties during this period led to a movement for welfare reform.

In 1900, the states of New South Wales and Victoria enacted legislation introducing non-contributory pensions for those aged 65 and over. Queensland legislated a similar system in 1907 before the Deakin government introduced a national aged pension under the Invalid and Old-Aged Pensions Act 1908. A national invalid disability pension was started in 1910, and a national maternity allowance was introduced by the Fisher government in 1912.

In the 1920s and 1930s, detailed proposals were developed for a comprehensive national insurance scheme covering medical, disability, unemployment and pension benefits. Multiple royal commissions were held on the subject and the scheme was legislated as the National Health and Pensions Insurance Act 1938. However, the scheme was ultimately abandoned for cost reasons in the lead-up to the Second World War.

During the Second World War, the federal government created a welfare state by enacting national schemes for: child endowment in 1941; a widows' pension in 1942; a wife's allowance in 1943; additional allowances for the children of pensioners in 1943; and unemployment, sickness, and special benefits in 1945.

Canada 
Canada's welfare programs are funded and administered at all levels of government (with 13 different provincial/territorial systems), and include health and medical care, public education (through graduate school), social housing and social services. Social support is given through programs including Social Assistance, Guaranteed Income Supplement, Child Tax Benefit, Old Age Security, Employment Insurance, Workers' Compensation, and the Canada/Quebec Pension Plans.

France 

After 1830, French liberalism and economic modernization were key goals.  While liberalism was individualistic and laissez-faire in Britain and the United States, in France liberalism was based instead on a solidaristic conception of society, following the theme of the French Revolution, Liberté, égalité, fraternité ("liberty, equality, fraternity").  In the Third Republic, especially between 1895 and 1914  "Solidarité" ["solidarism"] was the guiding concept of a liberal social policy, whose chief champions were the prime ministers Leon Bourgeois (1895–96) and Pierre Waldeck-Rousseau (1899-1902). The French welfare state expanded when it tried to follow some of Bismarck's policies. Poor relief was the starting point. More attention was paid to industrial labour in the 1930s during a short period of socialist political ascendency, with the Matignon Accords and the reforms of the Popular Front. Paxton points out these reforms were paralleled and even exceeded by measures taken by the Vichy regime in the 1940s.

Germany 

Some policies enacted to enhance social welfare in Germany were Health Insurance 1883, Accident Insurance 1884, Old Age Pensions 1889 and National Unemployment Insurance 1927. Otto von Bismarck, the powerful Chancellor of Germany (in office 1871–90), developed the first modern welfare state by building on a tradition of welfare programs in Prussia and Saxony that had begun as early as in the 1840s. The measures that Bismarck introduced – old-age pensions, accident insurance, and employee health insurance – formed the basis of the modern European welfare state. His paternalistic programs aimed to forestall social unrest and to undercut the appeal of the new Social Democratic Party, and to secure the support of the working classes for the German Empire, as well as to reduce emigration to the United States, where wages were higher but welfare did not exist. Bismarck further won the support of both industry and skilled workers through his high-tariff policies, which protected profits and wages from American competition, although they alienated the liberal intellectuals who wanted free trade.

During the 12 years of rule by Adolf Hitler's Nazi Party, the welfare state established by previous German governments was maintained, but it was restructured so as to help only Aryan individuals considered worthy of assistance, excluding "alcoholics, tramps, homosexuals, prostitutes, the 'work-shy' or the 'asocial', habitual criminals, the hereditarily ill (a widely defined category) and members of races other than the Aryan." Nevertheless, even with these limitations, over 17 million German citizens received assistance under the auspices of the Nationalsozialistische Volkswohlfahrt (NSV) by 1939. The agency projected a powerful image of caring and support for those who were seen as full members of the German racial community, but it also inspired fear through its intrusive questioning and the threat of opening investigations on those who did not fulfill the criteria for support.

India 

The Directive Principles of State Policy, enshrined in Part IV of the Indian Constitution reflects that India is a welfare state. Food security to all Indians are guaranteed under the National Food Security Act, 2013 where the government provides food grains to people at a very subsidised rate. There are public health insurance schemes, social aid to families and new mothers, free school meals, pension schemes and unemployment benefit schemes run both at the federal and the state level.

Latin America 
Welfare states in Latin America have been considered as "welfare states in transition", or "emerging welfare states". Welfare states in Latin America have been described as "truncated": generous benefits for formal-sector workers, regressive subsidies and informal barriers for the poor to obtain benefits. Mesa-Lago has classified the countries taking into account the historical experience of their welfare systems. The pioneers were Uruguay, Chile and Argentina, as they started to develop the first welfare programs in the 1920s following a bismarckian model. Other countries such as Costa Rica developed a more universal welfare system (1960s–1970s) with social security programs based on the Beveridge model. Researchers such as Martinez-Franzoni and Barba-Solano have examined and identified several welfare regime models based on the typology of Esping-Andersen. Other scholars such as Riesco and Cruz-Martinez have examined the welfare state development in the region.

About welfare states in Latin America, Alex Segura-Ubiergo wrote:
Latin American countries can be unequivocally divided into two groups depending on their 'welfare effort' levels. The first group, which for convenience we may call welfare states, includes Uruguay, Argentina, Chile, Costa Rica, and Brazil. Within this group, average social spending per capita in the 1973–2000 period was around $532, while as a percentage of GDP and as a share of the budget, social spending reached 51.6 and 12.6 percent, respectively. In addition, between approximately 50 and 75 percent of the population is covered by the public health and pension social security system. In contrast, the second group of countries, which we call non-welfare states, has welfare-effort indices that range from 37 to 88. Within this second group, social spending per capita averaged $96.6, while social spending as a percentage of GDP and as a percentage of the budget averaged 5.2 and 34.7 percent, respectively. In terms of the percentage of the population actually covered, the percentage of the active population covered under some social security scheme does not even reach 10 percent.

Middle East 

Saudi Arabia, Kuwait, and the United Arab Emirates are examples of welfare states in the Middle East.

Nordic countries 

The Nordic welfare model refers to the welfare policies of the Nordic countries, which also tie into their labor market policies. The Nordic model of welfare is distinguished from other types of welfare states by its emphasis on maximizing labor force participation, promoting gender equality, egalitarian and extensive benefit levels, the large magnitude of income redistribution and liberal use of the expansionary fiscal policy.

While there are differences among the Nordic countries, they all share a broad commitment to social cohesion, a universal nature of welfare provision in order to safeguard individualism by providing protection for vulnerable individuals and groups in society and maximizing public participation in social decision-making. It is characterized by flexibility and openness to innovation in the provision of welfare. The Nordic welfare systems are mainly funded through taxation.

People's Republic of China 

China traditionally relied on the extended family to provide welfare services. The one-child policy introduced in 1978 has made that unrealistic, and new models have emerged since the 1980s as China has rapidly become richer and more urban. Much discussion is underway regarding China's proposed path toward a welfare state. Chinese policies have been incremental and fragmented in terms of social insurance, privatization, and targeting. In the cities, where the rapid economic development has centered, lines of cleavage have developed between state-sector and non-state-sector employees, and between labor-market insiders and outsiders.

Sri Lanka 
In 1995, the government started the Samurdhi (Prosperity) program aimed at reducing poverty, having replaced the Jana Saviya poverty alleviation programme that was in place at the time.

Singapore 
In Singapore, the government provides financial and social support through a variety of social assistance schemes for lower and middle-income Singaporeans. The Ministry of Social and Family Development runs ComCare, a program which provides income support for low-income citizen households through various schemes for short-to-medium term assistance, long-term assistance, child support, and urgent financial needs. The Community Development Councils also run various local assistance schemes within their districts. The Ministry of Manpower runs a Silver Support Scheme which provides additional financial support for low-income elderly with no family support. Meanwhile, the Ministry of Health also runs MediFund to assist anyone on their behalf to pay off the rest of their medical bills after initial government subsidies, other health financing schemes as well as funds from the Central Provident Fund has been used.

In 2012, the Community Health Assist Scheme (CHAS) was introduced. It is a medical card that provides extended subsidies exclusively for Singaporean citizens usually from lower-to-middle income households, as well as the older generations, where they could receive treatment for common illnesses, chronic health problems and specific dental issues at private clinics for free. The intentions behind the scheme was to encourage Singaporeans to use such a card and tap into the private healthcare sector for common or minor chronic illnesses, as well as dental care, to reduce the strain at public community hospitals. Originally, only a blue and orange card existed, depending on their household income. The CHAS scheme was further expanded in 2019 to include a new green card that provides for all Singaporeans no matter their household income. As a result, all Singaporeans became covered for chronic and common illnesses as well as dentistry at privately owned clinics. Subsidies for complex chronic conditions was also increased.

In addition, the National Council of Social Service coordinates a range of 450 non-government voluntary welfare organisations to provide social services, while raising funds through The Community Chest of Singapore. Taking the World Bank's International Poverty Line (IPL)'s poverty threshold into account, the population of Singaporeans living below the poverty line is virtually non-existent. Singapore also has one of the highest housing ownership rates in the world – over 90 percent – owing to the government's policy of constructing extensive and quality public housing throughout the country and providing extensive subsidies for its citizens to obtain them.

United Kingdom 

About the British welfare state, historian Derek Fraser wrote:

The modern welfare state in the United Kingdom began operations with the Liberal welfare reforms of 1906–1914 under Liberal Prime Minister H. H. Asquith. These included the passing of the Old-Age Pensions Act 1908, the introduction of free school meals in 1909, the Labour Exchanges Act 1909, the Development and Road Improvement Funds Act 1909, which heralded greater government intervention in economic development, and the National Insurance Act 1911 setting up a national insurance contribution for unemployment and health benefits from work.

The People's Budget was introduced by the Chancellor of the Exchequer, David Lloyd George, in 1909 to fund the welfare reforms. After much opposition, it was passed by the House of Lords on 29 April 1910.

The minimum wage was introduced in the United Kingdom in 1909 for certain low-wage industries and expanded to numerous industries, including farm labour, by 1920. However, by the 1920s, a new perspective was offered by reformers to emphasize the usefulness of family allowance targeted at low-income families was the alternative to relieving poverty without distorting the labour market. The trade unions and the Labour Party adopted this view. In 1945, family allowances were introduced; minimum wages faded from view. Talk resumed in the 1970s, but in the 1980s the Thatcher administration made it clear it would not accept a national minimum wage. Finally, with the return of Labour, the National Minimum Wage Act 1998 set a minimum of £3.60 per hour, with lower rates for younger workers. It largely affected workers in high turnover service industries such as fast food restaurants, and members of ethnic minorities.

December 1942 saw the publication of the Report of the Inter-Departmental Committee on Social Insurance and Allied Services, commonly known as the Beveridge Report after its chairman, Sir William Beveridge. The Beveridge Report proposed a series of measures to aid those who were in need of help, or in poverty and recommended that the government find ways of tackling what the report called "the five giants": Want, Disease, Ignorance, Squalor, and Idleness. It urged the government to take steps to provide citizens with adequate income, adequate health care, adequate education, adequate housing, and adequate employment, proposing that "[a]ll people of working age should pay a weekly National Insurance contribution. In return, benefits would be paid to people who were sick, unemployed, retired, or widowed." The Beveridge Report assumed that the National Health Service would provide free health care to all citizens and that a Universal Child Benefit would give benefits to parents, encouraging people to have children by enabling them to feed and support a family. The report stressed the lower costs and efficiency of universal benefits. Beveridge cited miners' pension schemes as examples of some of the most efficient available and argued that a universal state scheme would be cheaper than a myriad of individual friendly societies and private insurance schemes and also less expensive to administer than a means-tested government-run welfare system for the poor.

The Liberal Party, the Conservative Party, and then the Labour Party all adopted the Beveridge Report's recommendations. Following the Labour election victory in the 1945 general election many of Beveridge's reforms were implemented through a series of Acts of Parliament. On 5 July 1948, the National Insurance Act, National Assistance Act and National Health Service Act came into force, forming the key planks of the modern UK welfare state. In 1949, the Legal Aid and Advice Act was passed, providing the "fourth pillar" of the modern welfare state, access to advice for legal redress for all.

Before 1939, most health care had to be paid for through non-government organisations – through a vast network of friendly societies, trade unions, and other insurance companies, which counted the vast majority of the UK working population as members. These organizations provided insurance for sickness, unemployment, and disability, providing an income to people when they were unable to work. As part of the reforms, the Church of England also closed down its voluntary relief networks and passed the ownership of thousands of church schools, hospitals and other bodies to the state.

Welfare systems continued to develop over the following decades. By the end of the 20th-century parts of the welfare system had been restructured, with some provision channelled through non-governmental organizations which became important providers of social services.

United States 

The United States developed a limited welfare state in the 1930s.  The earliest and most comprehensive philosophical justification for the welfare state was produced by an American, the sociologist Lester Frank Ward (1841–1913), whom the historian Henry Steele Commager called "the father of the modern welfare state".

Ward saw social phenomena as amenable to human control. "It is only through the artificial control of natural phenomena that science is made to minister to human needs" he wrote, "and if social laws are really analogous to physical laws, there is no reason why social science should not receive practical application such as have been given to physical science." Ward wrote:
The charge of paternalism is chiefly made by the class that enjoys the largest share of government protection. Those who denounce it are those who most frequently and successfully invoke it. Nothing is more obvious today than the single inability of capital and private enterprise to take care of themselves unaided by the state; and while they are incessantly denouncing "paternalism," by which they mean the claim of the defenseless laborer and artisan to a share in this lavish state protection, they are all the while besieging legislatures for relief from their own incompetency, and "pleading the baby act" through a trained body of lawyers and lobbyists. The dispensing of national pap to this class should rather be called "maternalism," to which a square, open, and dignified paternalism would be infinitely preferable.

Ward's theories centred around his belief that a universal and comprehensive system of education was necessary if a democratic government was to function successfully. His writings profoundly influenced younger generations of progressive thinkers such as Theodore Roosevelt, Thomas Dewey, and Frances Perkins (1880–1965), among others.

The United States was the only industrialized country that went into the Great Depression of the 1930s with no social insurance policies in place. In 1935 Franklin D. Roosevelt's New Deal instituted significant social insurance policies. In 1938 Congress passed the Fair Labor Standards Act, limiting the work week to 40 hours and banning child labor for children under 16, over stiff congressional opposition from the low-wage South.

The Social Security law was very unpopular among many groups – especially farmers, who resented the additional taxes and feared they would never be made good. They lobbied hard for exclusion. Furthermore, the Treasury realized how difficult it would be to set up payroll deduction plans for farmers, for housekeepers who employed maids, and for non-profit groups; therefore they were excluded. State employees were excluded for constitutional reasons (the federal government in the United States cannot tax state governments). Federal employees were also excluded.

By 2013, the U.S. remained the only major industrial state without a uniform national sickness program. American spending on health care (as a percent of GDP) is the highest in the world, but it is a complex mix of federal, state, philanthropic, employer and individual funding. The US spent 16% of its GDP on health care in 2008, compared to 11% in France in second place.

Some scholars, such as Gerard Friedman, argue that labor-union weakness in the Southern United States undermined unionization and social reform throughout the United States as a whole, and is largely responsible for the anemic U.S. welfare state. Sociologists Loïc Wacquant and John L. Campbell contend that since the rise of neoliberal ideology in the late 1970s and early 1980s, an expanding carceral state, or government system of mass incarceration, has largely supplanted the increasingly retrenched social welfare state, which has been justified by its proponents with the argument that the citizenry must take on personal responsibility. Scholars assert that this transformation of the welfare state to a post-welfare punitive state, along with neoliberal structural adjustment policies and the globalization of the U.S. economy, have created more extreme forms of "destitute poverty" in the U.S. which must be contained and controlled by expanding the criminal justice system into every aspect of the lives of the poor.

Other scholars such as Esping-Andersen argue that the welfare state in the United States has been characterized by private provision because such a state would better reflect the racial and sexual biases within the private sector. The disproportionate number of racial and sexual minorities in private sector jobs with weaker benefits, he argues, is evidence that the American welfare state is not necessarily intended to improve the economic situation of such groups.

Effects

Effects of welfare on poverty 

Empirical evidence suggests that taxes and transfers considerably reduce poverty in most Western countries whose welfare states constitute at least a fifth of GDP.

Effects of social expenditure on economic growth, public debt and education 

Researchers have found very little correlation between economic performance and social expenditure. They also see little evidence that social expenditures contribute to losses in productivity; economist Peter Lindert of the University of California, Davis attributes this to policy innovations such as the implementation of "pro-growth" tax policies in real-world welfare states, nor have social expenses contributed significantly to public debt. Martin Eiermann wrote:
According to the OECD, social expenditures in its 34 member countries rose steadily between 1980 and 2007, but the increase in costs was almost completely offset by GDP growth. More money was spent on welfare because more money circulated in the economy and because government revenues increased. In 1980, the OECD averaged social expenditures equal to 16 percent of GDP. In 2007, just before the financial crisis kicked into full gear, they had risen to 19 percent – a manageable increase.

A Norwegian study covering the period 1980 to 2003 found welfare state spending correlated negatively with student achievement. However, many of the top-ranking OECD countries on the 2009 PISA tests are considered welfare states.

Social expenditure as a percentage of GDP 
The table below shows social expenditure as a percentage of GDP for OECD member states in 2018:

Criticism and response 

Early conservatives, under the influence of Thomas Malthus (1766-1834), opposed every form of social insurance "root and branch". Malthus believed that the poor needed to learn the hard way to practice frugality, self-control and chastity. Traditional conservatives also protested that the effect of social insurance would be to weaken private charity and loosen traditional social bonds of family, friends, religious and non-governmental welfare organisations.

On the other hand, Karl Marx opposed piecemeal reforms advanced by middle-class reformers out of a sense of duty. In his Address of the Central Committee to the Communist League, written after the failed revolution of 1848, he warned that measures designed to increase wages, improve working conditions and provide social insurance were merely bribes that would temporarily make the situation of working classes tolerable to weaken the revolutionary consciousness that was needed to achieve a socialist economy. Nevertheless, Marx also proclaimed that the Communists had to support the bourgeoisie wherever it acted as a revolutionary progressive class because "bourgeois liberties had first to be conquered and then criticised".

In the 20th century, opponents of the welfare state have expressed apprehension about the creation of a large, possibly self-interested, bureaucracy required to administer it and the tax burden on the wealthier citizens that this entailed.

In 2012, political historian Alan Ryan pointed out that the modern welfare state stops short of being an "advance in the direction of socialism. [...] [I]ts egalitarian elements are more minimal than either its defenders or its critics think". It does not entail advocacy for social ownership of industry. Ryan further wrote:
The modern welfare state, does not set out to make the poor richer and the rich poorer, which is a central element in socialism, but to help people to provide for themselves in sickness while they enjoy good health, to put money aside to cover unemployment while they are in work, and to have adults provide for the education of their own and other people's children, expecting those children's future taxes to pay in due course for the pensions of their parents' generation. These are devices for shifting income across different stages in life, not for shifting income across classes. Another distinct difference is that social insurance does not aim to transform work and working relations; employers and employees pay taxes at a level they would not have done in the nineteenth century, but owners are not expropriated, profits are not illegitimate, cooperativism does not replace hierarchical management.

In 2017, historian Walter Scheidel argued that the establishment of welfare states in the West in the early 20th century could be partly a reaction by elites to the Bolshevik Revolution and its violence against the bourgeoisie, which feared violent revolution in its own backyard. They were diminished decades later as the perceived threat receded. Scheidel spoke to Vice's Matt Taylor in an interview:
It's a little tricky because the US never really had any strong leftist movement. But if you look at Europe, after 1917 people were really scared about communism in all the Western European countries. You have all these poor people, they might rise up and kill us and take our stuff. That wasn't just a fantasy because it was happening next door. And that, we can show, did trigger steps in the direction of having more welfare programs and a rudimentary safety net in response to fear of communism. Not that they [the communists] would invade, but that there would be homegrown movements of this sort. American populism is a little different because it's more detached from that. But it happens roughly at the same time, and people in America are worried about communism, toonot necessarily very reasonably. But that was always in the background. And people have only begun to study systematically to what extent the threat, real or imagined, of this type of radical regime really influenced policy changes in Western democracies. You don't necessarily even have to go out and kill rich peopleif there was some plausible alternative out there, it would arguably have an impact on policy making at home. That's certainly there in the 20s, 30s, 40s, 50s, and 60s. And there's a debate, right, because it becomes clear that the Soviet Union is really not in very good shape, and people don't really like to be there, and all these movements lost their appeal. That's a contributing factor, arguably, that the end of the Cold War coincides roughly with the time when inequality really starts going up again, because elites are much more relaxed about the possibility of credible alternatives or threats being out there.

See also

Notes

References

Further reading 

 
 
 
 Esping-Andersen, Gøsta; Politics against markets, Princeton, NJ: Princeton University Press (1985).
 
 Kenworthy, Lane. Social Democratic America. Oxford University Press (2014). 
 Korpi, Walter; "The Democratic Class Struggle"; London: Routledge (1983).
 Koehler, Gabriele and Deepta Chopra; "Development and Welfare Policy in South Asia"; London: Routledge (2014).
 
 Kuhnle, Stein. Survival of the European Welfare State 2000 Routledge 
 
 Pierson, P. (1994). Dismantling the Welfare State?: Reagan, Thatcher and the Politics of Retrenchment. Cambridge: Cambridge University Press. 
 
 Rothstein, Bo. Just institutions matter: the moral and political logic of the universal welfare state (Cambridge University Press, 1998)
 Radcliff, Benjamin (2013) The Political Economy of Human Happiness (New York: Cambridge University Press).
 
 
 Van Kersbergen, K. "Social Capitalism"; London: Routledge (1995).
 
 Silvestri P., "The All too Human Welfare State. Freedom Between Gift and Corruption", Teoria e critica della regolazione sociale, 2/2019, pp. 123-145. DOI: https://doi.org/10.7413/19705476007

External links

Data and statistics 
 OECD
 Health Policy and Data: Health Division
 OECD – Social Expenditure database (SOCX)
 Figures on wages and benefit systems in various OECD member states
 Contains information on social security developments in various EC member states from 1957 to 1978
 Contains information on social security developments in various EC member states from 1979 to 1989
 Contains information on social assistance programmes in various EC member states in 1993
 Contains detailed information on the welfare systems in the former Yugoslav republics
 The impact of benefit and tax uprating on incomes and poverty (UK)

 
Capitalism
Comparative politics
Government aid programs
Social democracy
Christian democracy